Nicholas Ryan Novak (born August 21, 1981) is a former American football placekicker. He was signed by the Chicago Bears as an undrafted free agent in 2005. He played college football at Maryland.

Novak has played for the Washington Redskins, Arizona Cardinals, San Diego Chargers, Kansas City Chiefs, New York Jets, and Houston Texans of the NFL, as well as the Cologne Centurions of NFL Europe, the Florida Tuskers of the United Football League (UFL), the Birmingham Iron of the Alliance of American Football (AAF) and the Los Angeles Wildcats of the XFL. In July 2021, Novak was named Head Football Coach at Maranatha High School in San Diego, California after a season as Maranatha’s Special Teams Coach. In January 2022, he was the Specialist/Assistant Coach 
on Jeff Fisher’s American Team Staff for the NFLPA Collegiate Bowl.

Early years
Novak was born and grew up in San Diego, California. After moving to Charlottesville, Virginia in 1994, Novak attended Albemarle High School where he was a letterman in football, soccer, and tennis. In football, he was a three-year varsity letterman, twice garnering All-District and All-Daily Progress honors, and winning All-State honors following his sophomore and senior seasons. Novak was also an All-District central defender on Albemarle's soccer team. On May 4, 2018 he was inducted into the Albemarle High School Hall of Fame.

College career
Novak attended the University of Maryland. It was during a nationally televised game in 2001 against Georgia Tech that the then-redshirt freshman established himself, successfully completing a 46-yard field goal to send the game into overtime, and earning his nickname, "The Kick". In the second stanza, Novak connected on a 26-yard field goal that ultimately won the game for a resurgent Terrapin team. Novak would go on to establish himself as one of the more consistent and clutch kickers in the country; his leg keyed comeback victories against North Carolina State in 2002 and 2003. Accordingly, he was frequently an all-conference specialist and a mainstay on the Lou Groza watchlist. During the first game of his senior season, he became the ACC's all-time leading scorer, kicking a field goal allowing him to surpass Scott Bentley's career total of 324 points. Novak ultimately ended his college career with 393 points, best in the league and fifth-best all-time amongst kickers in the NCAA at the time of his graduation.

He was awarded the Jim Tatum Award by the ACC, given annually to the top senior student-athlete among the league's football players. He is one of only three Maryland players to receive that award since its inception in 1979. Said Maryland Coach Ralph Freidgen, "I don't think there could have been a more deserving recipient for the Tatum Award than Nick Novak. Everything he does in his life is toward the goal of perfection. It has been a pleasure to see the effort that he has given both on the field and in the classroom and he is a tremendous example of the type of person and player we are looking for at the University of Maryland."

While at Maryland, Novak was a two-time member of the All-ACC Academic Football team, a three-time member of the ACC Honor Roll and made Maryland's Dean's List on three occasions. He is a three-time CoSida Academic All-District selection and was named the 2004 LeFrak Scholar, an honor given to a Maryland football player, basketball player and track athlete who "exhibits extraordinary athletic ability, leadership and athletic achievement."

Novak was also a member of the Maryland Alpha chapter of Phi Delta Theta at The University of Maryland in College Park.

In 2007, Novak was selected to be commemorated in a special edition poster recognizing the top 30 figures in Maryland football history entitled "A Winning Tradition", "honoring and paying tribute to the players and coaches who made a significant impact on the Maryland Football Program, both on and off the field over the past fifty plus years."

Professional career

Washington Redskins
Novak, an undrafted free agent, signed with the Washington Redskins in September 2005, and appeared in five games, notably hitting a game-winning extra point in a season opening Monday night game at Dallas and coming through with a game-saving tackle on the ensuing kickoff. That year, he also kicked a game-winning field goal in overtime against the Seattle Seahawks, which kept the Redskins undefeated and atop the NFC East. Because he was signed that year for the limited purpose of filling in for an ailing John Hall, he was released shortly after Hall returned to form.  He was signed almost immediately by the Arizona Cardinals, for kickoff duties while Neil Rackers hobbled through the latter half of the 2005 season. Novak appeared in five games for the Cardinals in 2005 and was 3 for 3 on field goal attempts.

After spending the 2006 preseason with the Cardinals, he re-signed with the Washington Redskins on October 10, 2006, again replacing injured kicker John Hall. On November 5, after Novak missed a 49-yard field goal with 35 seconds left, Redskin safety Troy Vincent blocked a Dallas Cowboys field goal; Sean Taylor picked the ball up and ran it all the way to the Dallas 45-yard line. Then, a facemask penalty was called which moved the ball to the Cowboy 30 and gave the Redskins one more play with no time on the clock. Novak then kicked a 47-yard field goal to defeat Dallas 22–19.  It was subsequently ranked the fourth greatest moment in FedExField history by Redskins.com. On December 4, the Redskins released Novak in favor of Shaun Suisham.

NFL Europe
After the end of the 2006 season, he was signed by the Chicago Bears and allocated to NFL Europa where he was the placekicker for the Cologne Centurions in NFL Europa's final season. He had a successful campaign in Europe, including a game-winner for the third-place Centurions. After an impressive preseason with the Bears, Novak was released due to the presence of All-Pro kicker Robbie Gould.

Kansas City Chiefs
Novak auditioned for several teams during the 2007 season, including the San Diego Chargers, the Jacksonville Jaguars and the Kansas City Chiefs. Novak was signed by the Kansas City Chiefs on February 18, 2008.

On September 28, 2008, Novak kicked four field goals for the Chiefs in their 33–19 victory over the Denver Broncos. On October 21, 2008, Novak was cut after missing two field goals in the previous game.

San Diego Chargers
Novak signed with the reigning AFC West Champion San Diego Chargers on April 29, 2010 to provide depth behind Nate Kaeding. After matching Kaeding, but ultimately losing out to the incumbent, the Chargers released him in the final round of preseason cuts.

Florida Tuskers
The Florida Tuskers of the United Football League signed Novak for the 2010 season. In his league debut against the Las Vegas Locomotives, Novak set the UFL record for the longest field goal with a 54-yarder. In that game he also made a 23-yard field goal and three-point after touchdown kicks. For his performance, he was named the UFL Special Teams Player of the Week. Against Hartford in Week 4, Novak was again named UFL Special Teams Player of the Week when he connected on field goals of 29, 42, 24, and 38 yards, in a close Tusker victory. Novak's four field goals were a single-game United Football League record, as were his 15 overall points. During the regular season, Novak led the league in points with 69, was 15–18 on field goals and holds every league and career place-kicking record in UFL history. Novak added on 2 field goals and 2 extra points in the UFL Championship to push his overall point total to 77 and his final field goal total to 17/21. On November 24, Novak was named the UFL Special Teams MVP for the 2010 season.

Notably, in mid-October 2010, the San Diego Chargers wanted to sign Novak to replace an injured Nate Kaeding.  Novak beat out three other kickers in a tryout for the position at Charger Park. However, there were games still remaining in the UFL season and Novak remained under contract with the Tuskers.  The Chargers were willing to pay the UFL required release fee of $150,000 to get him, but the UFL denied the request in order to keep Novak through the end of its season.

New York Jets
Novak signed with the New York Jets on February 9, 2011 to compete with incumbent Nick Folk. The New York Daily News chronicled his attempt to make the Jets' roster in an August 2011 feature entitled, "'Journeyman Nick Novak Gives Incumbent Nick Folk a Run for Starting Job in Jets Camp." He was waived by the Jets after the final pre-season game on August 30.

San Diego Chargers (second stint)
On September 13, 2011, Novak was re-signed to a two-year contract with the San Diego Chargers after Nate Kaeding suffered an ACL injury to his left knee on the opening kickoff against Minnesota. During the 2011 season, Novak made 27 of 34 field goals and set team records for field goals of 40 yards (12) and 50 yards (4) or longer. He established an NFL career-high with a 53-yard field goal. 2 of his 3 onside kicks were recovered.  He also made a career-high five field goals in a win at Denver.

He competed for the Chargers job during the 2012 preseason and had a strong showing before losing out to Kaeding. He was released on August 31. On September 29, 2012, the Chargers re-signed Novak after Kaeding suffered a groin injury. He filled in for three games, and became the permanent kicker after Kaeding was released in late October.

Novak's 18/20 (90%) field goal percentage during the 2012 regular season was the third most efficient campaign in Chargers history. His two misses were from 54 and 55 yards.  He converted his other two attempts from beyond 50 yards.  On December 9, 2012, Novak became only the fourth kicker in Heinz Field history to make a field goal of more than 50 yards there.  The 34–24 victory was the first ever regular season win for the Chargers over the Steelers at Pittsburgh.  He was 33 of 33 on extra points.  50% of his onside kicks were recovered (NFL average is around 20%) and he had 22 touchbacks out of 60 kickoffs with the opponents average starting field position being the 21.6 yard-line. Of 30 NFL kickers and Special Teams Units with at least 30 kick-offs in 2012, only 4 had a better avg. kick-off starting field position than Novak and the Chargers (19.9 – Browns, 20.6 – Bears, 20.8 – Vikings and 21.4 – Ravens).
Novak and the Chargers ranked at various spots in the top three in avg. kick-off starting field position for the majority of the year.

Novak set a new single-season efficiency record in 2013, connecting on 34 of 37 field goals (91.9%) for the playoff-bound Chargers. His 34 field goals also tied John Carney's single-season record for kicks made (34 of 38 in 1994). He was 11 for 11 on kicks over 40 yards and 2 of his 3 misses were blocked kicks.  Novak also had 5 tackles on Special Teams. During 2013, Novak passed Bolt greats Charlie Joiner and Gary Garrison for career scoring as a Charger and ended the year in 8th place all-time with 353 points. He was voted First-team All-AFC West. Novak also made several timely kicks to aid the Chargers' playoff run. In Week 2, Novak drilled a tie-breaking 45-yard field goal in the final seconds to beat the Philadelphia Eagles 33–30. In Week 6 on Monday Night Football vs. the Indianapolis Colts, Novak capped off a 4–4 night with a 50-yard field goal in the final 2 minutes to seal a 19–9 victory. Finally, he kicked a 36-yard field goal in overtime that turned out to be the game-winner in the Chargers' playoff-clinching win over the Kansas City Chiefs in Week 17.

In a Week 3 win over the Buffalo Bills in 2014, Novak made two field goals to extend his streak of successful field goal attempts to 23, passing Kaeding for second in Chargers history behind Carney's 29. He surpassed Carney later in the season, extending his streak to 32. In Week 14, Novak also filled in as a punter after replacing the injured Mike Scifres. In Week 16, he kicked a game-winning 40-yard field goal against the San Francisco 49ers in overtime to keep the Chargers in contention for a playoff berth. In 2015, Novak was released in the final round of preseason cuts in favor of undrafted rookie Josh Lambo. Novak did not have a touchback in the final half of 2014, while Lambo displayed a strong leg during exhibition games.

Novak converted 101 of 117 (86.3%) field goals during his four years with San Diego. He ended up 6th on the all-time Chargers scoring list with 503 points, passing Lance Alworth's 500 points.

He was released by the Chargers on September 5, 2015.

Houston Texans
Novak signed with the Houston Texans on September 29, 2015. In 13 regular season games, he was 18/21 on field goals, good for 85.7%, with his three misses coming from beyond 50 yards. It was the fourth most efficient season in Texans' history. His longest make was from 51 yards. He was 29/31 on extra points (93.5%), above the league average of 93.36%, from the new 33-yard PAT distance. Of the 32 NFL kickers who took at least 20 PAT's in 2015, 15 missed less than 2, and the average number of total misses was 2.09. Novak had his best year statistically for touchbacks, getting 23 on 62 kickoffs. The opponents' average starting field position on Novak's 62 kickoffs was the 24-yard-line (tied for 16th out of the 32 active kickers/kick-off specialists and their coverage units as of week 17).

Novak's consistent kicking in 2015, helped key several victories on the way to the Texans' AFC South Championship.
 
Novak is 22nd in NFL history with a career field goal percentage of 82.8 (2005–2016). During his last six years as the season-long, or nearly season-long starting place-kicker for the Chargers and Texans, he is 154/179, for 86%.

On December 24, 2016, versus the Cincinnati Bengals, Novak set new single season Texans' marks for both field goals made (34) and field goals attempted (39). The Texans also clinched their second consecutive AFC South Championship with a 12–10 victory. Novak finished the season with a career best 35 field goals out of 41 attempts for 85.4%. He also finished the season with 127 points, good for the fourth best season point total in Texans history.

On January 7, 2017, in a wild card playoff matchup versus the Oakland Raiders, Novak kicked two field goals, from 50 and 38 yards, and 3 extra points in a 27–14 victory.

On March 8, 2017, Novak signed a one-year contract extension with the Texans.

On September 2, 2017, Novak was released by the Texans in favor of Ka'imi Fairbairn, who was considered to have a stronger leg.

Los Angeles Chargers
On October 5, 2017, Novak signed with the Los Angeles Chargers after struggles from rookie Younghoe Koo. On October 15, 2017, he kicked the game-winning field goal against the Oakland Raiders. On November 19, 2017, in a 54–24 win against the Buffalo Bills, Novak scored 18 points and tied Hall of Famer Lance Alworth for sixth on the all-time scoring list, with 500 points as a Charger. He passed Alworth with a field goal the following week (503 points). On November 23, 2017, Novak suffered a back injury against Dallas Cowboys. He was placed on injured reserve on December 2, 2017. 

Novak was named to the 2010s (2010-2019) San Diego/LA Chargers All-Decade Team (Boltbeat.com, Chargerswire - USAToday, Boltsfromtheblue.com, The Athletic).

Birmingham Iron
On August 6, 2018, Novak was signed by the Birmingham Iron of the Alliance of American Football league. In the 2019 AAF season opener against the Memphis Express, Novak made all four of his field goal attempts in a 26–0 victory; for his performance, he was named AAF Special Teams Player of the Week. On March 14, 2019, he kicked a memorable last second game-winner in a 32-29 victory over the Fleet at SDCCU Stadium in San Diego. The league ceased operations in April 2019.

Los Angeles Wildcats
In October 2019, Novak was selected by the Los Angeles Wildcats in the 2020 XFL Draft's open phase. He was placed on injured reserve on March 3, 2020. He had his contract terminated when the league suspended operations on April 10, 2020.

NFL career statistics

References

External links
Official website

1981 births
Living people
Players of American football from San Diego
American football placekickers
Maryland Terrapins football players
Chicago Bears players
Dallas Cowboys players
Washington Redskins players
Arizona Cardinals players
Kansas City Chiefs players
San Diego Chargers players
Florida Tuskers players
New York Jets players
Houston Texans players
Los Angeles Chargers players
Birmingham Iron players
Los Angeles Wildcats (XFL) players
Albemarle High School (Virginia) alumni